William John D. Kinghorn (27 February 1912 – 1977) was a Scottish footballer who played as a midfielder.

External links
 LFC History profile

1912 births
1977 deaths
Scottish footballers
Liverpool F.C. players
Kirkintilloch Rob Roy F.C. players
Queen's Park F.C. players
Pollok F.C. players
Leicester City F.C. wartime guest players
Brighton & Hove Albion F.C. wartime guest players
Manchester City F.C. wartime guest players
Newcastle United F.C. wartime guest players
Leeds United F.C. wartime guest players
Blackburn Rovers F.C. wartime guest players
Burnley F.C. wartime guest players
Place of birth missing
Scotland amateur international footballers
Association football midfielders